Lav Mantula (8 December 1928 – 1 December 2008) was a footballer who represented Yugoslavia at the 1954 FIFA World Cup.

Club career
He played club football in Yugoslavia with FK Sarajevo, Dinamo Zagreb and NK Zagreb and in Switzerland with Servette and Sion.

International career
He made his debut and played his only game for Yugoslavia in a September 1954 friendly match away against Wales.

Managerial career
He also coached in Switzerland, managing the club sides Sion, Zürich and Neuchâtel Xamax.

References

External links

1928 births
2008 deaths
Footballers from Sarajevo
Association football midfielders
Yugoslav footballers
Yugoslavia international footballers
1954 FIFA World Cup players
FK Sarajevo players
GNK Dinamo Zagreb players
NK Zagreb players
Servette FC players
FC Sion players
Yugoslav First League players
Swiss Super League players
Yugoslav expatriate footballers
Expatriate footballers in Switzerland
Yugoslav expatriate sportspeople in Switzerland
Yugoslav football managers
FC Sion managers
FC Zürich managers
Neuchâtel Xamax FCS managers
Expatriate football managers in Switzerland